ASIRI is Asosiasi Industri Rekaman Indonesia, an association in Indonesia

Asiri or ASIRI may also relate to:

 Al-Asiri, a surname in Arabic
 Asiri Hospital Holdings, a hospital group in Sri Lanka
 Hoseyni, Yazd, a village in Iran also known as ’aşīrī